Dawn Marie Tilbury is an American control theorist whose research topics include logic control, networked control systems, robotics, human–machine systems, and autonomous vehicles. She is a professor of mechanical engineering and (by courtesy) of electrical engineering and computer science at the University of Michigan, and the head of the directorate for engineering at the National Science Foundation.

Education and career
Tilbury majored in electrical engineering at the University of Minnesota, choosing the subject because her father was an electrical engineer at Honeywell, and despite being told by her adviser that it was "not a good major for women". As a student, she began her work in control theory with a summer internship at Honeywell involving thermostats. She graduated summa cum laude, with a minor in French, in 1989, and completed her Ph.D. in electrical engineering and computer science at the University of California, Berkeley in 1994. Her dissertation, Exterior differential systems and nonholonomic motion planning, was supervised by Shankar Sastry, and concerned the problem of parallel parking for a vehicle towing multiple trailers. Throughout her education, none of her engineering professors were women.

She joined the University of Michigan as an assistant professor in 1995 and became full professor there in 2007. At Michigan, she has also directed the Ground Robotics Reliability Center from 2009 to 2011 and served as associate dean for research from 2014 to 2016.

She was appointed assistant director for engineering at the National Science Foundation in 2017, retaining her professor position at the University of Michigan. She is also vice president of the American Automatic Control Council.

Recognition
Tilbury was named an IEEE Fellow in the class of 2009, affiliated with the IEEE Control Systems Society, "for leadership in networked and logic control systems". She was named a Fellow of the American Society of Mechanical Engineers (ASME) in 2012.

The American Automatic Control Council gave Tilbury their Donald P. Eckman Award, given annually to an outstanding young researcher in control theory, in 2001, "for research exemplifying engineering aspects of control systems and for significant contributions to logic control and networked/distributed control". The Society of Women Engineers named her as the inaugural winner of their Distinguished Engineering Educator award in 2012. In 2014 the ASME gave her their biennial Michael J. Rabins Leadership Award.

Selected publications
Tilbury is the coauthor of Control Tutorials for MATLAB and Simulink: A Web-based Approach (with W. C. Messner, Addison-Wesley, 1998) and Feedback Control of Computing Systems (with J. L. Hellerstein, Y. Diao, and S. Parekh, Wiley, 2004). Other highly-cited publications of Tilbury include:

References

External links
Home page

Year of birth missing (living people)
Living people
American electrical engineers
American mechanical engineers
American women engineers
Control theorists
University of Minnesota College of Science and Engineering alumni
University of California, Berkeley alumni
University of Michigan faculty
United States National Science Foundation officials
Fellow Members of the IEEE
Fellows of the American Society of Mechanical Engineers
American women academics
21st-century American women